Qızılhacılı (also, Kyzylgadzhily and Kyzylgadzhyly) is the most populous village and municipality in the Goranboy Rayon of Azerbaijan, except for the city of Goranboy.  The village has a population of 6,758; the municipality has a population of 8,380. The municipality consists of the villages of Qızılhacılı, Balakürd, and Ballıqaya.

Notable natives 

 Fikret Hajiyev — National Hero of Azerbaijan.
 Yunis Aliyev — National Hero of Azerbaijan.

References 

Populated places in Goranboy District